Erotica is the third and final studio album by British alternative rock band the Darling Buds, released in 1992 by Epic Records. The album shares a name with, and a similar cover to, the Madonna album of the same name, which was released two weeks later.

Critical reception
Trouser Press wrote: "Lewis comes into her own on the aptly named Erotica (also made with producer Street), on which a fine band matures in sound yet still capitalizes on its original strength—namely, brilliant hookcraft."

Track listing
All songs written by Andrea Lewis and Harley Farr, except where noted.
 "One Thing Leads to Another" (Lewis, McDonagh) – 5:21
 "Sure Thing" (Farr, McDonagh, Watkins) – 3:24
 "Off My Mind" – 5:17
 "Gently Fall" – 5:37
 "Please Yourself" (Lewis, Farr, McDonagh, Jo Callis) – 3:55
 "Angels Fallen" (Farr, McDonagh, Watkins) – 4:47
 "Isolation" (Lewis, McDonagh) (4:08
 "Long Day in the Universe" (Lewis, Farr, McDonagh, Watkins) – 4:12
 "Wave" – 4:20
 "If" – 3:37

Singles
 Sure Thing (1992)
 Long Day in the Universe (1992)
 Please Yourself (1993)

Members
Andrea Lewis – Vocals
Geriant "Harley" Farr – Guitar
Chris McDonogh – Bass
Jimmy Hughes- Drums

References

1992 albums
Albums produced by Stephen Street
The Darling Buds albums
Epic Records albums